Popess or papess (a female pope) may refer to:
 Pope Joan, mythical female pope
 The High Priestess, tarot card